The Tonga national rugby union team has played in all Rugby World Cup tournaments, except in 1991, when they did not qualify. Their best performances were in the 2007 and 2011 tournaments, when they won two matches. Their best single match win was an upset victory in 2011 over eventual finalists France.

By position
 1987 Rugby World Cup Eliminated in pool stages.
 1991 Rugby World Cup Did not qualify.
 1995 Rugby World Cup Eliminated in pool stages.
 1999 Rugby World Cup Eliminated in pool stages.
 2003 Rugby World Cup Eliminated in pool stages.
 2007 Rugby World Cup Eliminated in pool stages.
 2011 Rugby World Cup Eliminated in pool stages.
 2015 Rugby World Cup Eliminated in pool stages.
 2019 Rugby World Cup Eliminated in pool stages.

By match

1987 Rugby World Cup

Pool 2 games -

1995 Rugby World Cup

Pool D games -

1999 Rugby World Cup

Pool B games -

2003 Rugby World Cup

Group D games-

2007 Rugby World Cup
Pool A matches -

2011 Rugby World Cup

Tonga played in Pool A. After losing to New Zealand and Canada, they beat Japan and then had an upset victory over eventual finalists France, their greatest World Cup match result to date.

2015 Rugby World Cup

Pool C

2019 Rugby World Cup

Pool C

Hosting
So far Tonga has not hosted any World Cup games, and has not put in bids for future tournaments. Due to the lack of facilities, and the small size of the island nation, it is unlikely it will do so in the future.

References
 Davies, Gerald (2004) The History of the Rugby World Cup (Sanctuary Publishing Ltd,
 Farr-Jones, Nick, (2003). Story of the Rugby World Cup, Australian Post Corporation,

Tonga national rugby union team
Rugby World Cup by nation